Beautiful Energy is the first album by Twelve Girls Band.  It consists of fifteen songs played in a modernized Chinese form. It was released in 2003.

Track list
 "Miracle"
 "Freedom"
 "Sekai ni Hitotsu Dake no Hana"
 "Shangri-La"
 "Take Five"
 "Kawa no Nagare no Yō ni"
 "A Girl's Dream"
 "Alamuhan"
 "Liu San Jie"
 "Love Story wa Totsuzen ni"
 "Mountains and Rivers"
 "Hepbeat"
 "Forbidden City"
 "No Word"
 "Chijo no Hoshi"

2003 albums
Twelve Girls Band albums